Richard Brook Cathcart (born 1943) is an American geographer who specializes in macro-engineering.

See also
List of geographers

External links
About

1943 births
Living people
American geographers
Place of birth missing (living people)
Date of birth missing (living people)